Montserrat Roig i Fransitorra (Barcelona, 13 June 1946 – 10 November 1991) was a Catalan writer of novels, short stories and articles.

Biography 
Roig was born in 1946 into a liberal middle-class family in Barcelona's Eixample neighborhood, the sixth of seven children of lawyer and writer Tomàs Roig i Llop and Albina Fransitorra. She was born and lived most of her life on Bailén Street.

Education 
She began her schooling in 1951 at the Col·legi Mari del Diví Pastor, also on Bailén Street. At the age of 13, she enrolled at the Institut Montserrat, where she completed her pre-university education.

From 1961 to 1964, she studied at the Escola d'Art Dramàtic Adrià Gual (Adrià Gual School of Dramatic Arts), appearing as an actress in multiple productions. She earned a degree in philosophy and letters from the University of Barcelona in 1968 and a doctorate in 1970.

Literary and academic career

In 1970, Roig won the Víctor Català prize for Molta roba i poc sabó... i tan neta que la volen, a compilation of short stories, and began to dedicate herself to writing literature. She began a literary cycle composed of works such as Ramona adéu (1972), which portrays three generations of women – grandmother, mother and daughter – who live their own stories with key moments in Catalan history as a background, or El temps de les cireres (1977), starring the same characters, for which Roig received the "Premi Sant Jordi de novel·la" in 1976.

L'hora violeta (1980) is the novel which culminates her feminist positioning. From then on, her novels took a different turn. Later, she published L'òpera quotidiana (1982), La veu melodiosa (1987) and a compilation of short stories with the title El cant de la joventut (1989). The last of her publications was Digues que m'estimes encara que sigui mentida (1991), where she conveys personal poetry as a literary will.

Montserrat Roig was a member of the Association of Catalan Language Writers (Associació d'Escriptors en Llengua Catalana) and vice-president of its Junta Territorial del Principat de Catalunya (Territorial Committee of the Catalan Principality) (1989–1990).

She worked as a lecturer in Catalan and Spanish at the University of Bristol, England during the academic year 1972–1973. From January to April 1983, she taught Catalan history and creative writing at the Department of Hispanic and Latin American Studies of the University of Strathclyde in Glasgow, Scotland, by invitation of the Carneggie Foundation. From January to June 1990, she taught twentieth-century Spanish literature and creative writing at the University of Arizona.

Political activism and journalism
Montserrat Roig was a feminist and a Leftist. As a young woman, she participated in the student protest movements of the last years of Francoist Spain. She was among the many Catalan intellectuals who assembled in the monastery of Montserrat to protest the Burgos Trial in 1970. She twice joined and subsequently left the Unified Socialist Party of Catalonia. Socialist Party of Catalonia). She was active in the feminist movement and published three books about women and feminism ¿Tiempo de mujer? (1980), El feminismo (1981) and Mujeres hacia un nuevo humanismo (1981).

Her work as a journalist is also remarkable, showing her will to build a tradition of cultured, feminist journalism and recover the historical memory of her country. She gained popularity as an interviewer, both in print and on television, first contributing to the magazine Serra d'Or with interviews later published in 1975 and 1976 as a series of books titled Retrats paral·lels ("Parallel portraits") In 1977 she began working for the Catalan division of Televisión Española, where she produced a program of interviews called "Personatges", later collected in two books of the same title.

Roig's 1977 nonfiction book Els catalans als camps nazis ("Catalans in the Nazi Camps"), which included testimony from Catalans who survived deportation to Nazi concentration camps, was honored with the Serra d'Or critics' prize. Her book L'agulla daurada ("The Golden Spire"), inspired by a two-month stay in Leningrad, dealt with the siege of Leningrad during the Second World War and earned her the National Prize of Catalan Literature (essay) in 1986.

From 1984 to 1989 she was a daily columnist for El Periódico, and from September 1990 until her death she contributed regularly to the Catalan-language newspaper Avui. Her columns for Avui were published in the posthumous collection Un pensament de sal, un pessic de pebre (1992).

Death 
During her stay at the University of Arizona, Roig began to feel unwell and, upon returning to Europe, she was diagnosed with an aggressive form of breast cancer. Her final article for Avui was published the day before her death. Montserrat Roig died in Barcelona on 10 November 1991, at the age of 45, and is interred in the Montjuïc Cemetery in Barcelona.

Works 
 Molta roba i poc sabó... i tan neta que la volen, 1970
 Ramona, adéu, 1972
 El temps de les cireres, 1977
 Els catalans als camps nazis, 1977
 L'hora violeta, 1980
 ¿Tiempo de mujer? 1980
 L'Òpera quotidiana, 1982
 L'agulla daurada, National Prize of Catalan Literature (1986), 1985
 La veu melodiosa, 1987
 El cant de la joventut, 1989
 English translation by Tiago Miller, The Song of Youth, shortlisted for 2022 Republic of Consciousness Prize
 Reivindicació de la senyora Clito Mestres (play), 1990
 An English translation, The Vindication of Senyora Clito Mestres, opened at the Persephone Theatre in Saskatoon, Canada in 1997.
 Digues que m'estimes encara que sigui mentida, 1991

Bibliography 
 Davies, Catherine. Contemporary Feminist Fiction in Spain: The Work of Montserrat Roig and Rosa Montero (New Directions in European Writing), 1994. Berg Publishers.

References

External links 
 
 Website of the TV3 biographical documentary series NOMSdedicated to Montserrat Roig 

1946 births
1991 deaths
Writers from Barcelona
Catalan-language writers
Deaths from cancer in Spain
Deaths from breast cancer
Burials at Montjuïc Cemetery